The Macro-Jibaro proposal, also known as (Macro-)Andean, is a language proposal of Morris Swadesh and other historical linguists. The two families, Jivaroan and Cahuapanan are most frequently linked, the isolates less often. Documentation of Urarina is underway as of 2006, but Puelche and Huarpe are extinct. Kaufman (1994) linked Huarpe instead to the Muran languages and Matanawi (see Macro-Warpean), but as of 1990 found the Jibaro–Cahuapanan connection plausible. It forms one part of his expanded 2007 suggestion for Macro-Andean.

David Payne (1981) proposes that Candoshi is related to Jivaroan, which Payne calls Shuar. Together, Shuar and Candoshi make up a putative Shuar-Candoshi family, for which Payne (1981) provides a tentative reconstruction of Proto-Shuar-Candoshi.

References

Payne, David Lawrence. 1981. "Bosquejo fonológico del Proto-Shuar-Candoshi: evidencias para una relación genética." Revista del Museo Nacional 45. 323-377.

Indigenous languages of South America
Proposed language families